Atlanta Airport may refer to:

 Hartsfield-Jackson Atlanta International Airport serving Atlanta, Georgia, United States (FAA: ATL; ICAO: KATL)
 Atlanta Airport (Idaho) serving Atlanta, Idaho, United States (FAA: 55H)
 Atlanta Municipal Airport serving Atlanta, Michigan, United States (FAA: Y93)

See also
List of airports in the Atlanta area, for Atlanta, Georgia